Micropholis gnaphaloclados is a species of plant in the family Sapotaceae. It is endemic to Brazil.  It is threatened by habitat loss.

References

Flora of Brazil
gnaphaloclados
Near threatened plants
Taxonomy articles created by Polbot